San Javier may refer to:

Francis Xavier (1506–1552), a Roman Catholic saint
San Javier Library, a library park in Medellín, Colombia

Places

Argentina
San Javier, Misiones, a town in the Misiones province
San Javier, Río Negro Province, a village and municipality in Río Negro province
San Javier, Santa Fe, a city in Santa Fe province
San Javier River (Santa Fe), a side channel of the Paraná River in the province of Santa Fe, Argentina

San Javier River (Tucumán)

Bolivia
San Javier, Beni, a small town
San Javier, Ñuflo de Chávez, Santa Cruz Department
San Javier Municipality, Beni, a municipality in Beni Department

Chile
San Javier, Chile

El Salvador
San Francisco Javier, a municipality in Usulután department

Mexico
San Javier, Baja California Sur, a village
Misión San Francisco Javier de Viggé-Biaundó, a Spanish mission in San Javier, Baja California Sur, Mexico

San Javier, Jalisco, a municipality
San Javier, Sinaloa, birthplace of Senator María Serrano Serrano
San Javier, Sonora, a town

Peru
San Javier de Alpabamba District, Ayacucho

Spain
San Javier, Murcia
Murcia–San Javier Airport, a military air base and civilian passenger airport

Uruguay
San Javier, Uruguay, Río Negro Department

See also
San Javier Department (disambiguation)
San Javier Municipality (disambiguation)
San Javier River (disambiguation)
San Xavier (disambiguation)
St. Xavier (disambiguation)
Javier (disambiguation)